"Jump to the Beat" is a song written by Narada Michael Walden and Lisa Walden. It was originally released by American singer Stacy Lattisaw in 1980 when it became a big hit in the UK, peaking at No.3. It was later covered by Australian singer Dannii Minogue on her debut album, Love and Kisses in 1991.

Release
Stacy Lattisaw was only 13 years old when "Jump to the Beat" was released in May 1980. Although it was not released as a North American single, therefore did not chart on the Billboard Hot 100, it reached No.1 (along with another song "Dynamite!") on the Billboard dance charts. Released in edited form as a single internationally, it became a big hit during the summer of 1980 in the UK, where it peaked at No.3 in July. It was to be her only major hit there although she continued to achieve success in the US with later singles. The song also performed well in Europe, hitting the charts in a number of countries. The song was included on Lattsaw's second album, Let Me Be Your Angel.

Charts

Dannii Minogue version

Australian singer Dannii Minogue released a cover of "Jump to the Beat" in 1991. Her version was produced by Les Adams, Emma Freilich (L.A. Mix) and Andy Whitmore and received a mixed reception from music critics. It was released as the third single from her debut album, Love and Kisses in the third quarter of 1991 and reached the top-five in Ireland and the top-ten in the United Kingdom, and became Minogue's second top ten single. In Australia, the song did not perform as well, charting outside the top-forty. In North America, the single was released as Minogue's debut release in November 1991; however, it failed to generate much interest outside of the United Kingdom and Australia.

Critical reception
Matthew Hocter from Albumism noted that "with a clearer focus on that New Jack Swing sound" and the addition of some "heavy on house music" covers "Jump to the Beat" and "Baby Love", "the younger Minogue demonstrated that she had a very soulful approach to music." John Lucas from AllMusic called the song "a fairly perfunctory cover". Larry Flick from Billboard commented, "Kylie's younger sister bows with a hyper pop/house jam that is fueled with a fun, sing-along chorus and a groove that should easily rope in programmers at both club and crossover radio levels. Rap by Einstein is miscellaneous, while Minogue's chirpy voice endears." Marc Andrews from Smash Hits wrote that the song is one of the "highlights" on the Love and Kisses album. He also described it as a "dance-fantastic single".

Music video
A music video was produced to promote the single, directed by Australian film director, screenwriter and cinematographer Paul Goldman.

Formats and track listings
These are the formats and track listings of major single releases of "Jump to the Beat".

 Japanese single
 "Jump to the Beat" (7" mix)
 "Jump to the Beat" (Album version)

 UK vinyl single
 "Jump to the Beat" (Extended mix)
 "Hallucination"
 "Success" (Funky Tony mix)

 UK Cassette Single
 "Jump to the Beat"
 "Jump to the Beat" (LP Edit)

 European CD single
 "Jump to the Beat" 
 "Hallucination"
 "Success" (funky tony dub)

 Australian Cassingle
(C10482)
 "Jump to the Beat"
 "Jump to the Beat" (LP Edit)

 Australian CD single
(D10482)
 "Jump to the Beat" (Album version)
 "Jump to the Beat" (Extended mix)
 "Hallucination"

 Australian 12" vinyl single
(X14076)
 "Jump to the Beat" (Extended mix)
 "Hallucination"
 "Success" (Funky Tony mix)

 US vinyl single
 "Jump to the Beat" (12" mix)
 "Hallucination"
 "Jump to the Beat" (7" mix)

 US CD single
 "Jump to the Beat" (7" Version)
 "Jump to the Beat" (7" Remix)
 "Jump to the Beat" (12" Version)
 "Hallucination"

Note: "Jump to the Beat" is one of only two singles release by Minogue that did not receive a CD format release in the UK.

Charts

Personnel
The following people contributed to "Jump to the Beat":
Dannii Minogue – lead vocals
Colin "Einstein" Case – rap vocals
Les Adams, Emma Freilich, Andy Whitmore – production
Phil Bodger – remix, additional production
Simon Fowler – photography

Official versions
 "Jump to the Beat" (Album version/LP Edit/7" Remix) (4:04)
 "Jump to the Beat" (7" Mix) (3:36)
 "Jump to the Beat" (12" Version/Extended Mix) (6:30)
 "Jump to the Beat" (L.A. Master Remix) (4:35)
 "Jump to the Beat" (No rap version on "Love's on Every Corner" single)

Notes

1980 singles
1991 singles
Dannii Minogue songs
Songs written by Narada Michael Walden
1980 songs
MCA Records singles
Stacy Lattisaw songs
Cotillion Records singles
Atlantic Records singles
Mushroom Records singles
Universal Music Group singles
Song recordings produced by Narada Michael Walden
Songs about dancing
Funk songs